William Farquharson may refer to:
 William Farquharson (surgeon) (1760–1823), Scottish surgeon
 William Farquharson (cricketer) (1864–1928), Jamaican cricketer
 William Farquharson (politician) (1888–1950), Canadian politician